The church in Niepokalanów, devoted to the Blessed Virgin Mary the Immaculate, the Omni-mediatress of All Glories, was designed by the architect from Cracow - Zygmunt Gawlik. It was built between 1948 and 1954, in difficult times for Poland. In June 1950 it became a parish church for a new parish in Niepokalanów.

Three-nave church can accommodate up to five thousand people. The height of the church tower is 47 m. Three massive, double winged doors hold symbols of the most famous places of Marian apparitions around the world. In April 1980, Pope John Paul II granted the church the title of the basilica minor.

Plans and construction of the church 
The first idea to build a new church in Niepokalanów (or at least a large chapel), appeared before the Second World War. In 1933 the magazine "Rycerz Niepokalanej" ("The Knight of the Immaculate") wrote: It is necessary to build a new chapel, or - as some of the readers want - the church, because there is no room to accommodate all of us. Unfortunately, at that time, the Franciscans did not have adequate funds to start the building.

Construction plans were prepared and approved in December 1938 in Warsaw. An external company was hired for analysis of the land on which the church was to stand. In May 1939, there was blessed a cross on the square assigned for building the church. The outbreak of war in September 1939, stopped the work for a long time.

After the war, in June 1948, the first brick was put for the building of a new church. The design was made by the architect Zygmunt Gawlik. The church, devoted to the BVM the Immaculate, the Omni-mediatress of All Glories, could hold up to 5000 people. It was consecrated on 3 October 1954 by Bishop Wacław Majewski, who replaced the imprisoned cardinal Stefan Wyszyński.

Professional co-friars worked at decoration of the interior of the church: sculptors, stonemasons, blacksmiths and so on. Many of the sculptures were made by Artist-Friar Maurycy Kowalewski, with the help of Friar Abel Dziełyński and the other friars. On the church tower there were mounted four clock bells, named: Knight of the Immaculata, Maximilian, Francis and Anthony.

Architecture and specifications 
Entering the church, a visitor can see the statue of Our Lady Immaculate in the main altar. This statue is a work of Maurycy Kowalewski and Abel Dziełyński, friars-sculptors from Niepokalanów. In the chapel of St. Joseph (on the right side of the church) there are two important mosaics. The first of them (round mosaic) commemorates the baptism of Poland. The Latin inscription says: Mesco dux baptizatur - Polonia semper fidelis - 966-1966 (Prince Mieszko baptized - Poland is always faithful - 966-1966). The second, huge mosaic (placed on the wall) shows Jesus the Merciful and the Immaculate Heart of Our Lady.

The chapel on the left side is dedicated to St. Maximilian Kolbe. A marble statue of the saint, placed in the central part of the chapel, offers the entire globe to the Mother of God. On the chapel walls there are hung many votive offerings, in thanksgiving for the graces received. A round mosaic, located next to them, presents a speech of St. Maximilian to the co-prisoners in the Auschwitz camp. Near, in the central part of the church there is situated a Carrara marble ambo. Bas-reliefs of the Holy Trinity, Christ teaching in the boat and the Evangelists, can attract the attention of visitors in the nave.

The specifications of the basilica are:
- the length from the beginning of the stairs to the end of the apse - 84,8 m.
- the length of the interior of the basilica - 69 m.
- the height of the main nave - 16 m.
- the width of the church - 18 m. (the width with both side chapels - 33 m.)
- the height of the tower clock - 47 m.

Pope John Paul II and other pilgrims 
Since the time of the beatifications of Fr. Maximilian Kolbe (1971), many important guests visited Niepokalanów and the local basilica. There were bishops, cardinals and high rank politic officials among them. Cardinal Stefan Wyszynski, Primate of Poland, who visited Niepokalanów several times, said once: "Before the war Niepokalanów grew far and wide. After the war the hard times came, and then the Franciscans, unable to keep up their common job, did the wisest thing they could - they built a church."

On 18 June 1983, during the 2nd Pastoral Visit in Poland, Pope John Paul II visited the basilica and the monastery in Niepokalanów. In the basilica he met the representatives of religious orders to which he gave a speech. Then, during the Holy Mass at the field altar he preached a sermon to over 300,000 people. The visit of the pope increased the number of pilgrims coming to Niepokalanów. Many people wanted to visit the place, sacred by activity of St. Maximilian, and to pray in the local basilica.

Small photo gallery

Source materials (books and links) 
 Niepokalanów. Pilgrimage and tourist guide, red. fr. Roman Soczewka OFMConv. Wydawnictwo ZET, Wrocław 2004, 
 o. Cezar Czesław Baran OFMConv., Franciszkańskie sanktuaria maryjne w Polsce. Wydawnictwo Pelikan, Warszawa 1990,  (book in Polish)
  The monastery of Niepokalanów. Basilica English version of the monastery's official site
 Miasto Niepokalanej (City of the Immaculate - article in Polish), p. 216-219, in: Rycerz Niepokalanej (The Knight of the Immaculate) nr 7-8/2010, Niepokalanów, ISSN 0208-8878

Basilica churches in Poland
Shrines to the Virgin Mary
Sochaczew County
Niepokalanów
Roman Catholic shrines in Poland